Kim Kyu-eun (Hangul:김규은) (born June 27, 1999) is a South Korean pair skater. With her skating partner, Alex Kang-chan Kam, she competed in the free skate at the 2017 Four Continents Championships and participated in the 2018 Winter Olympics.

Career

2013–14 season
Kim debuted on the ISU Junior Grand Prix (JGP) series in the 2013–14 season. She competed at 2013 JGP Tallinn, placing 9th with a total score of 132.45 points.

2014–15 season
Early in the 2014–15 season, Kim placed 4th at the Asian Open Trophy held in Taipei, Taiwan, her first senior international competition. She competed at a second ISU competition, 2014 JGP Pokal der Blauen Schwerter, placing 15th with total score 106.72. A month later, she placed 7th in senior ladies at the 2014 CS Ice Challenge held in Graz, Austria.

2016–2018 
Since 2016 till 2018, Kim competed in pair skating with Alex Kang-chan Kam. The pair's international debut took place in early February 2016 at the Sarajevo Open. The following season, they moved up to the senior level, placing 5th at the 2016 CS Autumn Classic International, and participated in the 2017 Four Continents Championships. During the 2017–2018 season, they participated in the 2018 Winter Olympics and in the 2018 World Figure Skating Championships.

During the 2018–2019 season, Kim trained with Maxime Deschamps to represent South Korea, but their partnership got dissolved after a few months.

Programs

With Kam

Single skating

Competitive highlights 
CS: Challenger Series; JGP: Junior Grand Prix

Pairs with Kam

Ladies' singles

Detailed results

Pairs with Kang-chan Kam

Single skating 

 Personal best highlighted in bold.

References

External links
 
 

1999 births
Living people
South Korean female single skaters
South Korean female pair skaters
Figure skaters at the 2017 Asian Winter Games
Figure skaters at the 2018 Winter Olympics
Olympic figure skaters of South Korea